Lionel Green (born October 5, 1984) is an American former professional basketball player for the Akita Northern Happinets of the Japanese bj league.

Career statistics

Regular season

|-
| align="left" | 2011–12
| align="left" | Ura
| 16 ||   || 33.9 || .440 || .338 || .458 || 10.2 || 1.9 || 1.8 || 0.1|| 19.4
|-
| align="left" | 2011–12
| align="left" | Akita
| 23 || 8 || 13.3 || .398 || .273 || .259 || 3.4 || 1.2 || 0.6 || 0.1|| 5.0
|-
| align="left"  style="background-color:#afe6ba; border: 1px solid gray" |  2012–13
| align="left" | Baerum Basket
| 9 || 9 || 29.4 || .448 || .273 || .579 || 8.89 || 2.33 || 1.78 || 0.78 ||  16.22
|-

Playoffs 

|-
|style="text-align:left;"|2010–11
|style="text-align:left;"|Akita
| 4 ||  || 16.3 || .308 || .259 || .600 || 3.5 || 1.0 || 1.5 || 0.0 || 8.5
|-
|style="text-align:left;"|2012–13
|style="text-align:left;"|	Baerum
| 2 ||  || 34.5|| .308 || .000 || .417 || 9.5 || 1.5 || 2.5 || 0.5 || 10.5
|-

External links
Akita vs Sendai
Bio

References

1984 births
Living people
Akita Northern Happinets players
American expatriate basketball people in Finland
American expatriate basketball people in Japan
American expatriate basketball people in Norway
American men's basketball players
Basketball players from New Orleans
Northeastern Oklahoma A&M Golden Norsemen basketball players
Southern University at New Orleans alumni
Forwards (basketball)